Chatuphum Chinnawong (born 19 July 1993 in Nakhon Ratchasima, Thailand) is a Thai weightlifter competing in the 77 kg category. He finished fourth at the 2012 Summer Olympics and 2016 Summer Olympics.This stands to be upgraded to third, pending the IOC medal reallocation process, as a result of the gold medalist being disqualified for doping offences.

Results

References 

Chatuphum Chinnawong
1993 births
Living people
Weightlifters at the 2012 Summer Olympics
Weightlifters at the 2016 Summer Olympics
Chatuphum Chinnawong
Weightlifters at the 2010 Summer Youth Olympics
Weightlifters at the 2014 Asian Games
Weightlifters at the 2018 Asian Games
Asian Games medalists in weightlifting
Chatuphum Chinnawong
Medalists at the 2014 Asian Games
Medalists at the 2018 Asian Games
Chatuphum Chinnawong
Chatuphum Chinnawong